The Global Smokefree Partnership is a multipartner initiative formed to promote effective smokefree air policies worldwide. The Partnership works by helping practitioners and advocates of smokefree policies.

The Partnership is currently hosted by the International Union Against Tuberculosis and Lung Disease (The Union) and the Framework Convention Alliance, and the current partners are listed below:

    Aer Pur Romania  
    African Heart Network 
    Afrique Contre le Tabac 
    Alianca de Controle do Tabagismo de Brasil (ACT - Brazil) 
    Alianza Libre de Humo Argentina (ALIAR) 
    Alliance Nationale des Consommateurs et de l'Environment (ANCE - TOGO) 
    American Cancer Society 
    American Heart Association
    American University of Armenia 
    Americans for Nonsmokers' Rights 
    APALTA Honduras 
    Asociaciòn Espanola Contral el Cancer 
    Bangladesh Heart Foundation 
    Campaign for Tobacco-Free Kids 
    Centro de Investigacion para la Epidemìa del Tabaquismo (CIET) 
    Comité National Contre le Tabagisme (CNCT) 
    Dutch Heart Foundation 
    European Healthy Stadia Network 
    European Network for Smoking and Tobacco Prevention 
    Framework Convention Alliance
    Fundaciòn Ecuatoriana de Salud Respiratoria (FESAR) 
    Garant 
    Generations Sans Tabac 
    Global Bridges 
    Health Related Information Dissemination Amongst Young (HRIDAY)
    HealthBridge
    Heart Foundation of Jamaica
    Heart and Stroke Foundation of South Africa 
    Heart of Mersey 
    Human Rights and Tobacco Control Network (HRTCN) 
    Institute for Global Tobacco Control of Johns Hopkins University 
    Interamerican Heart Foundation
    International Union Against Tuberculosis and Lung Disease (The Union)
    Isfahan Cardiovascular Research Institute
    ITC Project
    Jamaican Coalition for Tobacco Control
    Jeewaka Foundation
    King Hussein Cancer Center
    MACT India
    OxyRomandie
    Public Health Law Center
    Regional Advocacy Center LIFE (Ukraine)
    Romanian Society of Pneumology
    Romtens Foundation
    Roswell Park Comprehensive Cancer Center
    SouthEast Asia Tobacco Control Alliance
    Stivoro
    Tobacco Prevention and Control Research center
    Treatobacco.net
    Volunteers Against Smoking and Tobacco
    Work for a Better Bangladesh (WBB) Trust
    World Heart Federation
    World Lung Foundation
    European Respiratory Society
    LILT - Italian Cancer League
    Global Dialogue for Effective Stop-Smoking Campaigns

Notes

Tobacco control